The grammar of Old Saxon is highly inflected, similar to that of Old English or Latin. As an ancient Germanic language, the morphological system of Old Saxon is similar to that of the hypothetical Proto-Germanic reconstruction, retaining many of the inflections thought to have been common in Proto-Indo-European and also including characteristically Germanic constructions such as the umlaut. Among living languages, Old Saxon morphology most closely resembles that of modern High German.

Nouns, pronouns, adjectives and determiners were fully inflected with five grammatical cases (nominative, accusative, genitive, dative, and instrumental), two grammatical numbers (singular and plural) and three grammatical genders (masculine, feminine, and neuter). 

First- and second-person personal pronouns also had dual forms for referring to groups of two people, in addition to the usual singular and plural forms.
The instrumental case was somewhat rare and occurred mostly in the masculine singular, but also sometimes in the neuter singular. It never occurred in the feminine nor plural. Instrumental could typically be replaced by the dative.

Adjectives, pronouns and (sometimes) participles agreed with their antecedent nouns in case, number, and gender. Finite verbs agreed with their subject in person and number.

Nouns came in numerous declensions (with deep parallels in Latin, Ancient Greek and Sanskrit). Verbs came in ten main conjugations (seven strong and two weak + the remains of a third weak class), each with numerous subtypes, as well as a few additional smaller conjugations and a handful of irregular verbs. 

The main difference from other ancient Indo-European languages, such as Latin, is that verbs can be conjugated in only two tenses (vs. the six "tenses" – really tense/aspect combinations – of Latin), and, like Old English, have no synthetic passive voice (although it did still exist in Gothic).

Gender in nouns was grammatical, as opposed to the natural gender that prevails in modern English. That is, the grammatical gender of a given noun did not necessarily correspond to its natural gender, even for nouns referring to people. For example, thiu sunna (the Sun) was feminine, thê mâno (the Moon) was masculine, and that wîf "the woman/wife" was neuter. (Compare Old English sēo sunne (f.), se mōna (m.) and þæt wīf, but also modern German die Sonne, der Mond, das Weib.) Pronominal usage could reflect either natural or grammatical gender, when it conflicted.

Morphology

Verbs
Verbs in Old Saxon are divided into strong and weak verbs. Strong verbs indicate tense by a change in the quality of a vowel, while weak verbs indicate tense by the addition of an ending.

Here is a quick sum up of all the Old Saxon classes of strong and weak verbs. More information on these classes are given below.

Strong verbs

Strong verbs use the Germanic form of conjugation known as ablaut. In this form of conjugation, the stem of the word changes to indicate the tense. Verbs like this persist in modern English; for example sing, sang, sung is a strong verb, as is swim, swam, swum and choose, chose, chosen. The root portion of the word changes rather than its ending. In Old English, there were seven major classes of a strong verb; each class has its own pattern of stem changes. Learning these is often a challenge for students of the language, though English speakers may see connections between the old verb classes and their modern forms.

The classes had the following distinguishing features to their infinitive stems:
<li>ī + one consonant.
<li>io or ū + one consonant.
<li>e or i + two consonants.
<li>e + 1 consonant (usually l or r, plus the verb brekan 'to break').
<li>e + 1 consonant (usually a stop or a fricative).
<li>a + 1 consonant.
<li>Other than the above. Always a heavy root syllable (either a long vowel or short + two consonants), almost always a non-umlauted vowel – e.g. ō, ā, ē, a. Infinitive is distinguishable from class 1 weak verbs by non-umlauted root vowel; from class 1 weak verbs by lack of suffix -ian and from class 2 weak verbs by lack of suffix -on. First and second preterite have identical stems, usually in io (occ. ē), and the infinitive and the past participle also have the same stem.

The first preterite stem is used in the preterite, for the first- and third-person singular. The second preterite stem is used for second-person singular, and all persons in the plural (as well as the preterite subjunctive). Strong verbs also exhibit i-mutation of the stem in the second- and third-person singular in the present tense, and sometimes in the first person as well (especially class II, III, IV and V verbs).

Regular strong verbs were all conjugated roughly the same, with the main differences being in the stem vowel. Thus stelan 'to steal' represents the strong verb conjugation paradigm.

Weak verbs

The past and past-participle forms of weak verbs are formed with a (t or d) added to the end of the stem. Some modern English examples of this are love, loved or look, looked.

Originally, the weak ending was used to form the preterite of informal, noun-derived verbs such as often emerge in conversation and which have no established system of stem-change. By nature, these verbs were almost always transitive, and even today, most weak verbs are transitive verbs formed in the same way. The same process is found in Old English, and throughout the history of the English language. As English came into contact with non-Germanic languages, it invariably borrowed useful verbs which lacked established stem-change patterns. Rather than inventing and standardizing new classes or learning foreign conjugations, English speakers simply applied the weak ending to the foreign bases. The same process also happened with Dutch, German and occurs in modern Germanic languages.

There are three major classes of weak verbs in Old Saxon. The two first classes are recognizable as all their infinitives have the same ending -ian (1st class) and -on/-oian (2nd class). There is also a third class explained below, also ending with -ian.

Class-one verbs with short roots exhibit gemination of the final stem consonant in certain forms. Geminated ⟨f⟩ appears as ⟨bb⟩, and that of ⟨g⟩ appears as ⟨gg⟩.

Class-two verbs are recognizable in having an o-theme throughout the whole conjugation.

The following table shows the conjugation of three verbs: swebbian, "to put to sleep" is a class-one verb exhibiting gemination and an epenthetic vowel; dēlian "to share, deal" is a class-one verb exhibiting neither gemination nor an epenthetic vowel; galpon 'to cry' is a class-two verb.

Preterite-present verbs
The preterite-present verbs are a class of verbs which have a present tense in the form of a strong preterite and a past tense like the past of a weak verb. These verbs derive from the subjunctive or optative use of preterite forms to refer to present or future time. For example, witan, "to know" comes from a verb which originally meant "to have seen". The present singular is formed from the original singular preterite stem and the present plural from the original plural preterite stem. As a result of this history, the first-person singular and third-person singular are the same in the present.

Few preterite present appear in the Old Saxon corpus, and some are not attested in all forms.

[Forms above with asterisk (*) unattested]

Anomalous verbs 
Additionally, there is a further group of five verbs which are anomalous: 
 
dōn (to do)
gān (to go)
stān (to stand)
wesan/sīn (to be)
willian (to want)

These five have their own conjugation schemes which differ significantly from all the other classes of verb. This is not especially unusual: "want", "do", "go", and "be" are the most commonly used verbs in the language, and are very important to the meaning of the sentences in which they are used. Idiosyncratic patterns of inflection are much more common with important items of vocabulary than with rarely used ones.

The verbs dōn 'to do', stān 'to stand' and gān 'to go' are conjugated alike; willian 'to want' is similar outside of the present tense.

The verb 'to be' is actually composed of three different stems:

The present forms of wesan are almost never used. Therefore, wesan is used as the past, imperative, and present participle versions of sīn, and does not have a separate meaning. The b-stem is only met in the present indicative of wesan, and only for the 1st and 2nd persons in the singular.

Nouns
Old Saxon is an inflected language, and as such its nouns, pronouns, adjectives and determiners must be declined in order to serve a grammatical function. A set of declined forms of the same word pattern is called a declension. As in several other ancient Germanic languages, there are five major cases: nominative, accusative, dative, genitive and instrumental.

The Nominative case indicated the subject of the sentence, for example: thē kuning means 'the king'. It was also used for direct address. Adjectives in the predicate (qualifying a noun on the other side of 'to be') were also in the nominative.
The Accusative case indicated the direct object of the sentence, for example: Adam gisah thena kuning means "Adam saw the king", where Adam is the subject and the king (here God) is the object. Already the accusative had begun to merge with the nominative; it was never distinguished in the plural, or in a neuter noun.
The Genitive case indicated possession. For example: thes kuninges word means "the word of the king" or "the king's word". It also indicated partitive nouns.
The Dative case indicated the indirect object of the sentence; To/for whom the object was meant. For example: Hē gaf is brōd thēmu kuninge means "he gave his bread to the king". Here, the word kuning is its dative form: kuninge. There were also several verbs that took direct objects in the dative.
The Instrumental case indicated an instrument used to achieve something, for example: he warð swerde gikwelid, "he was killed by the sword", where swerde is the instrumental form of swerd. During the Old Saxon period, the instrumental was falling out of use, having largely merged with the dative. Only pronouns and strong adjectives retained separate forms for the instrumental.

In addition to inflection for case, nouns take different endings depending on whether the noun was in the singular (for example,  'one mountain') or plural (for example,  'many mountains'). Also, some nouns pluralize by way of Umlaut, and some undergo no pluralizing change in certain cases.

Nouns are also categorized by grammatical gender – masculine, feminine, or neuter. In general, masculine and neuter words share their endings. Feminine words have their own subset of endings. The plural of some declension types distinguishes between genders, e.g., a-stem masculine nominative plural  "stones" vs. neuter nominative plural  "ships" and  "words".

Furthermore, Old Saxon nouns are divided as either strong or weak. Weak nouns have their own endings. In general, weak nouns are easier than strong nouns, since they had begun to lose their declensional system. However, there is a great deal of overlap between the various classes of noun: they are not totally distinct from one another.

Old Saxon language grammars often follow the common NOM-ACC-GEN-DAT-INST order used for the Germanic languages.

Strong nouns
Here are the strong a-stem declensional endings and examples for each gender:

For the '-u/–' neuter forms above, the '-u' is used with a root consisting of a single short syllable such as bak ('back'), skip ('ship') or fat ('vat'). The feminine nominative -a is due to analogy with the accusative.

Here are the strong ja-stem declensional endings and examples for each gender:

Here is the i-stem declension. We will be using examples to display mutations:

Here is the u-stem declension. We will be using examples to display mutations:

Syntax
Old Saxon syntax is mostly different from that of English. Some were simply consequences of the greater level of nominal and verbal inflection – e.g., word order was generally freer.  In addition:
The default word order demanded that the second verb in a sentence be placed in the end of said sentence, such as that of modern Dutch or modern German.
There was no do-support in questions and negatives.
Multiple negatives could stack up in a sentence, and intensify each other (negative concord), which is not always the case in modern English nor modern Dutch nor modern German.
Sentences with subordinate clauses of the type "when X, Y" (e.g. "When I got home, I ate dinner") did not use a wh-type conjunction, but rather used a th-type correlative conjunction (e.g. thô X, thô Y in place of "when X, Y").  The wh-type conjunctions were used only as interrogative pronouns and indefinite pronouns.
Similarly, wh- forms were not used as relative pronouns (as in "the man who saw me" or "the car that I bought").  Instead, an indeclinable word the was used, often in conjunction with the definite article (which was declined for case, number and gender).

References
  (at the Internet Archive)
 
 

Old Saxon